San Patrizio a Villa Ludovisi is a Roman Catholic parish, titular church, and national church of the United States in Rome.

History
It was one of the national churches of Ireland until 2017 when it became the national church of the United States of America. Since August 2017 (when they were transferred from Santa Susanna), it has been under the pastoral care of the Missionary Society of Saint Paul the Apostle (Paulist Fathers), a religious order which originated and is based in New York City. 

It was built in 1908 to designs in a Romanesque-Byzantine revival style by Aristide Leonori. An earlier church on the site, was demolished, but a fresco was saved and installed in the new structure. The apse mosaic dates from 1929 and depicts Saint Patrick preaching to the crowds.

Its current Cardinal-Priest is Thomas Collins, the Archbishop of Toronto.

Since the move, the current National Church of Ireland is the Church of Sant'Isidoro a Capo le Case.

Cardinal-Priests
William Conway (25 February 1965 – 17 April 1977)
Tomás Ó Fiaich (30 June 1979 – 8 May 1990)
Cahal Daly (28 June 1991 – 31 December 2009)
Thomas Collins (18 February 2012 – present)

References

External links
 Chiesa di San Patrizio a Villa Ludovisi (Italian)
 St. Patrick's in Rome official web site
 English Masses in Rome, PNAC

Titular churches
National churches in Rome
20th-century Roman Catholic church buildings in Italy
Churches of Rome (rione Ludovisi)